Dry sack can refer to:

 a dry bag- a waterproof bag used in outdoor activities like kayaking and rafting to prevent damage to water-sensitive gear.
 a variety of dry sherry, also called sack